Erg Chech 002 (EC 002) is an ancient andesite meteorite discovered in the Erg Chech region of the Sahara Desert in Algeria. It is believed to be a fragment of a chondritic protoplanet that is over 4.566 billion years old, and is believed to be the oldest known volcanic rock on Earth.

References

External links 
 Erg Chech 002 at the Meteoritical Bulletin Database

Meteorites
Meteorites found in Algeria